Vladislavovka (Vladyslavivka) is a junction railway station in Vladislavovka village in Kirovske Raion of Crimea, a territory recognized by a majority of countries as part of Ukraine, but de facto under control and administration of Russia.

Main information
The station is a junction for Dzhankoy—Feodosia and Dzhankoy—Port Krym lines.

History
The station was opened in 1896 with the Dzhankoy — Feodosia line in Vladislavovka.

In 1900, after opening of the line to Kerch, Vladislavovka station became a hub. The station building was built by the architect M. I. Zarayskiy in 1953.

Trains
 Moscow — Simferopol
 Dzhankoy — Kerch
 Feodosia — Vladislavovka
 Feodosia — Kirovskaya
 Feodosia — Armyansk

References

External links
 Information
 Train times on Yandex

Railway stations in Crimea
Railway stations in the Russian Empire opened in 1896